This is a list of films and television programs containing corporal punishment scenes, which may be fictional or re-created and include military, prison, initiation, judicial and westerns.

Before 1930

1930s

1940s

1950s

1960s

1970s

1980s

1990s

2000s

2010s

References

 
Corporal punishment
Corporal punishment